Stafford County (standard abbreviation: SF) is a county located in the U.S. state of Kansas. As of the 2020 census, the county population was 4,072. Its county seat is St. John. The county is named in honor of Lewis Stafford, captain of Company E, First Kansas Infantry, who was killed at the Battle of Young's Point in Madison Parish, Louisiana on June 7, 1863.

History

Early history

For many millennia, the Great Plains of North America was inhabited by nomadic Native Americans.  From the 16th century to 18th century, the Kingdom of France claimed ownership of large parts of North America.  In 1762, after the French and Indian War, France secretly ceded New France to Spain, per the Treaty of Fontainebleau.

19th century
In 1802, Spain returned most of the land to France, but kept title to about 7,500 square miles.  In 1803, most of the land in modern-day Kansas was acquired by the United States from France as part of the 828,000 square mile Louisiana Purchase for 2.83 cents per acre.

In 1854, the Kansas Territory was organized, then in 1861 Kansas became the 34th U.S. state.  In 1879, Stafford County was established.

The boundaries of Stafford County were defined by the Kansas Legislature of 1870 but for several years, the county remained unorganized. The Legislature of 1875, with the intention of obliterating the county from the map, gave the territory in Stafford County to other counties. They gave the portion in Range 15 West to Pawnee County; the portion included in Ranges 11, 12, 13 and 14 to Barton County; and the south half of the county, excepting the portion in Range 15, was added to Pratt County. But after each of the counties had taken its part, a strip six miles wide and twelve miles long (two townships) remained as Stafford County. This was the condition of the county until April 25, 1879, when, by a decision of the Supreme Court, the act of the Legislature dividing the county was declared unconstitutional and the county was restored to its original boundaries.

Geography

Adjacent counties
 Barton County (north)
 Rice County (northeast)
 Reno County (east)
 Pratt County (south)
 Edwards County (west)
 Pawnee County (west)

National protected area
 Quivira National Wildlife Refuge (part)

Demographics

As of the census of 2000, there were 4,789 people, 2,010 households, and 1,294 families residing in the county.  The population density was 6 people per square mile (2/km2).  There were 2,458 housing units at an average density of 3 per square mile (1/km2).  The racial makeup of the county was 94.97% White, 0.15% Black or African American, 0.38% Native American, 0.13% Asian, 2.97% from other races, and 1.42% from two or more races.  5.41% of the population were Hispanic or Latino of any race.

There were 2,010 households, out of which 29.90% had children under the age of 18 living with them, 55.90% were married couples living together, 5.90% had a female householder with no husband present, and 35.60% were non-families. 33.00% of all households were made up of individuals, and 17.20% had someone living alone who was 65 years of age or older.  The average household size was 2.34 and the average family size was 2.99.

In the county, the population was spread out, with 26.30% under the age of 18, 5.40% from 18 to 24, 24.60% from 25 to 44, 22.50% from 45 to 64, and 21.20% who were 65 years of age or older.  The median age was 41 years. For every 100 females there were 95.20 males.  For every 100 females age 18 and over, there were 91.40 males.

The median income for a household in the county was $31,107, and the median income for a family was $38,235. Males had a median income of $27,328 versus $21,063 for females. The per capita income for the county was $16,409.  About 8.70% of families and 11.80% of the population were below the poverty line, including 15.20% of those under age 18 and 8.90% of those age 65 or over.

Government
Stafford County is often carried by Republican Candidates. The last time they have been carried by a democratic candidate was in 1976 by Jimmy Carter.

Presidential elections

Laws
Although the Kansas Constitution was amended in 1986 to allow the sale of alcoholic liquor by the individual drink with the approval of voters, Stafford County remained a prohibition, or "dry", county until an election in 2016 when this prohibition was removed by 1,304 to 535, 71% of the vote.

Education

Unified school districts
 Stafford USD 349
 St. John-Hudson USD 350
 Macksville USD 351

Communities

Cities
 Hudson
 Macksville
 Radium
 Seward
 Stafford
 St. John

Unincorporated communities
 Dillwyn
 Neola
 Zenith

Townships
Stafford County is divided into twenty-one townships.  None of the cities within the county are considered governmentally independent, and all figures for the townships include those of the cities.  In the following table, the population center is the largest city (or cities) included in that township's population total, if it is of a significant size.

See also
 National Register of Historic Places listings in Stafford County, Kansas

References

Notes

Further reading

 Standard Atlas of Stafford County, Kansas; Geo. A. Ogle & Co; 56 pages; 1904.

External links

County
 
 Stafford County - Directory of Public Officials
Maps
 Stafford County Maps: Current, Historic, KDOT
 Kansas Highway Maps: Current, Historic, KDOT
 Kansas Railroad Maps: Current, 1996, 1915, KDOT and Kansas Historical Society

 
Kansas counties
1879 establishments in Kansas
Populated places established in 1879